Milton Friedman's book Essays in Positive Economics (1953) is a collection of earlier articles by the author with as its lead an original essay "The Methodology of Positive Economics." This essay posits Friedman's famous, but controversial, principle (called the F-Twist by Samuelson) that assumptions need not be "realistic" to serve as scientific hypotheses; they merely need to make significant predictions.

Contents of the book
The book is organized in four parts:
 Introduction
 The Methodology of Positive Economics
 Price Theory
 The Marshallian Demand Curve
 The ‘Welfare’ Effects of an Income Tax and an Excise Tax
 Monetary Theory and Policy
 The Effects of a Full-Employment Policy on Economic Stability: A Formal Analysis
 A Monetary and Fiscal Framework for Economic Stability
 The Case for Flexible Exchange Rates
 Commodity-Reserve Currency
 Discussion of the Inflationary Gap
 Comments on Monetary Policy
 Comments on Method
 Lange on Price Flexibility and Employment – A Methodological Criticism
 Lerner on the Economics of Control

The Methodology of Positive Economics
This first essay in the book explores John Neville Keynes's distinction between positive and normative economics, what is vs. what ought to be in economic matters. The essay sets out an epistemological program for Friedman's own research.

The essay argues that economics as science should be free of normative judgments for it to be respected as objective and to inform normative economics (for example whether to raise the minimum wage).  Normative judgments frequently involve implicit predictions about the consequences of different policies.   The essay suggests that such differences in principle could be narrowed by progress in positive economics (1953, p. 5).

The essay argues that a useful economic theory should not be judged primarily by its tautological completeness, however important in providing a consistent system for classifying elements of the theory and validly deriving implications therefrom. Rather a theory (or hypothesis) must be judged by its:
 simplicity in being able to predict at least as much as an alternate theory, although requiring less information
 fruitfulness in the precision and scope of its predictions and in its ability to generate additional research lines (p. 10).

In a famous and controversial passage, Friedman writes that:
Truly important and significant hypotheses will be found to have "assumptions" that are wildly inaccurate descriptive representations of reality, and, in general, the more significant the theory, the more unrealistic the assumptions (in this sense) (p. 14).

This is because such hypotheses and descriptions extract only those crucial elements sufficient to yield relatively precise, valid predictions, omitting a welter of predictively irrelevant details.  Of course descriptive unrealism by itself does not ensure a "significant theory" (pp. 14–15).

From such Friedman rejects testing a theory by the realism of its assumptions.  Rather simplicity and fruitfulness incline toward such assumptions and postulates as utility maximization, profit maximization, and ideal types—not merely to describe (which may be beside the point) but to predict economic behavior and to provide an engine of analysis (pp. 30–35).
On profit maximization, for example, firms are posited to push each line of action to the point of equating the relevant marginal revenue and marginal cost.  Yet, answers of businessmen to questions about the factors affecting their decisions may show no such calculation.  Still, if firms act as if they are trying to maximize profits, that is the relevant test of the associated hypothesis (pp. 15, 22, 31).

Place in economic methodology
Friedman is acknowledged as a pivotal figure in the Chicago school of economics.  The essay can be read as a manifesto for that school.  Still, Melvin Reder writes that a significant minority of Chicago-school economists such as Ronald Coase and James M. Buchanan have written as if "the validity of an economic theory lies in its intuitive appeal and/or its compatibility with a set of common-sense axioms rather than the conformity of its implications with empirical observation."  Friedman's criterion of fruitfulness and usage of 'positive', however, seem to blur this point.

The essay's core claim and representation were by the late 1980s widely deployed in mainstream economics, even if methodological judgments, like other regulative judgments, are not purely positive. Its critics however, had by then long pointed out the flaw in Friedman's reasoning: by shielding assumptions from the requirement of realism, Friedman admits falsehoods as part of his theory. He defends against this by requiring only certain phenomena of interest to be explained, but as Samuelson pointed out, this can lead to unscientific cherry-picking of results. Samuelson dubbed Friedman's principle the F-Twist, avoiding naming it after Friedman directly out of courtesy.

Daniel M. Hausman described "The Methodology of Positive Economics" as "the most influential work on economic methodology of [the twentieth] century." He later noted that its influence was waning due to an empirical turn in economics that took place at the end the century, although by 2012 it still commonly served "as a way of avoiding awkward questions concerning simplifications, idealizations, and abstraction in economics rather than responding to them."

Notes

References
 Milton Friedman, 1953. Essays in Positive Economics, Chicago. Description and preview, including "The Methodology...," pp. 3–43].
 Lawrence A. Boland, 1987. “methodology," The New Palgrave: A Dictionary of Economics, v. 3, 455–58
 _, 2008.  "assumptions controversy," The New Palgrave Dictionary of Economics, 2nd Edition. Abstract.
 _, 2008. "instrumentalism and operationalism," The New Palgrave Dictionary of Economics, 2nd Edition.   Abstract.
 Bruce Caldwell, 1980a. "Positivist Philosophy of Science and the Methodology of Economics,"  Journal of Economic Issues, 14(1), pp. 53–76.
 _, 1980a. "A Critique of Friedman's Methodological Instrumentalism," Southern Economic Journal, 47(2), pp. 366–74.
 A. Coddington, 1972. "Positive Economics," Canadian Journal of Economics, 5(1), pp. 1–15.
 William J. Frazer, Jr. and Lawrence A. Boland, 1983. "An Essay on the Foundations of Friedman's Methodology," American Economic Review, 73(1), pp. 129–44. Reprinted in J.C. Wood & R.N. Woods, ed., Milton Friedman: Critical Assessments, v. III, pp. 458–79.
 Daniel M. Hausman, ed., 2007. The Philosophy of Economics: An Anthology, 3rd ed.
 Daniel M. Hausman, 2012. "Philosophy of Economics," in Edward N. Zalta, ed., The Stanford Encyclopedia of Philosophy.
 Kevin D. Hoover, 2009.  "The Methodology of Causal Realism," in Uskali Mäki, ed., The Methodology of Positive Economics: Reflections on the Milton Friedman Legacy, Cambridge, pp. 303–20.
 Richard G. Lipsey, 200). "positive economics."  The New Palgrave Dictionary of Economics, 2nd Edition. Abstract.
 Thomas Mayer, 1993. "Friedman's Methodology of Positive Economics: A Soft Reading," Economic Inquiry, 31(2), pp. 213–23. Abstract.
 M.W. Reder, 1987. “Chicago School," The New Palgrave: A Dictionary of Economics, v. 1, 41318.
 Eugene Rotwein, 1959. "On 'The Methodology of Positive Economics'," Quarterly Journal of Economics,73(4), pp. 554–75.
 Paul A. Samuelson, 1963.  "Problems of Methodology: Discussion," American Economic Review, 53(2) American Economic Review, pp. 231–36. Reprinted in J.C. Wood and R.N. Woods, ed., 1990, Milton Friedman: Critical Assessments, v. I. pp. 107–13. Preview. Routledge.
 A. Walters, 1987. "Friedman, Milton," The New Palgrave: A Dictionary of Economics, v. 2, 422–26.
  Stanley Wong, 1973. "The 'F-Twist' and the Methodology of Paul Samuelson," American Economic Review, 63(3) p pp. 312–25.  Reprinted in J.C. Wood & R.N. Woods, ed., 1990, Milton Friedman: Critical Assessments, v. II, pp.  224–43.
 _, 1987. “positive economics," The New Palgrave: A Dictionary of Economics, v. 3, 920–21.

External links
 , 1966. "The Methodology of Positive Economics," pp. 3–16, 30–43
 Link to text of Nobel prize lecture with pp. 1–2 on econ. methodology & the rest as example.

1953 non-fiction books
Works by Milton Friedman
University of Chicago Press books
Essay collections
Works about philosophy of economics